Domun may refer to:

Places 
 Domun, Ghana
 Domun, Khyber Pakhtunkhwa, Pakistan
 Tumen, Jilin, China

Other uses 
 Domun Railway, a former railway in Japanese-occupied Korea